The University of Architecture, Civil Engineering and Geodesy is located in Sofia, Bulgaria.

It was founded in 1942 as a Higher Technical School following a decree issued on June 6, 1941 by the Bulgarian Tsar Boris III. In 1945 it was transformed into a State Polytechnic. In 1953 the Polytechnic was divided into several institutes one of them being the Institute of Civil Engineering. Since 1977 the institute is renamed Higher Institute of Architecture and Civil Engineering (HIACE). In 1990 by a decision of its General Assembly the Institute was renamed University of Architecture, Civil Engineering and Geodesy (UACEG), the official accreditation being voted by the Parliament on 21 July 1995. On 15.11.2001 received institutional accreditation.

Faculties and departments 
 Faculty of Architecture
 Faculty of Geodesy
 Faculty of Hydrotechnics
 Faculty of Structural engineering
 Faculty of Transportation engineering
 Department of applied linguistics and physical culture

Rectors

Higher Technical School 
1942–1944: Yurdan Danchov 
1944–1945: Stancho Belkovski

State Polytechnic 
1945–1946; Vasil Peevski
1946–1947: Aleksi Kvartirnikov
1947–1948: Georgi Bradistilov
1948–1951: Aleksi Kvartirnikov
1951–1953: Sazdo Ivanov

References

External links 
 The official website of UACEG

Universities in Sofia
Geodesy organizations
1942 establishments in Bulgaria
Educational institutions established in 1942